Sanath Fernando (born 29 June 1969) is a Sri Lankan former first-class cricketer who played for Old Cambrians Sports Club and Sebastianites Cricket and Athletic Club.

References

External links
 

1969 births
Living people
Sri Lankan cricketers
Old Cambrians cricketers
Sebastianites Cricket and Athletic Club cricketers
Sportspeople from Moratuwa